Harry Lorraine may refer to:

 Harry Lorraine (American actor) (1873–1935), American actor
 Harry Lorraine (English actor) (1886–1934), English actor
 Harry Wolff (booking agent) (1890–1934), known as Harry Lorraine, American booking agent

See also 
 Harry Lorayne (born 1926), American magician and mnemonist